was a Japanese politician of the Liberal Democratic Party, a member of the House of Councillors in the Diet (national legislature) and the Parliamentary Secretary for Foreign Affairs. A native of Kesennuma City, Miyagi Prefecture, he graduated from Tohoku University in 1964. He was elected to the House of Councillors for the first time in 1998.

References 
 

Members of the House of Councillors (Japan)
1941 births
2012 deaths
Liberal Democratic Party (Japan) politicians
Deaths from cancer in Japan
People from Kesennuma, Miyagi
Deaths from gallbladder cancer
Tohoku University alumni
Politicians from Miyagi Prefecture